Foreign internal defense (FID) is a term used by militaries in several countries, including the United States, France, and the United Kingdom, to describe an integrated, and possibly multi-country, approach to combating actual or threatened insurgency in a foreign state.  This foreign state is known as the Host Nation (HN) under the US (and generally accepted NATO) doctrine. The term counter-insurgency is more commonly used worldwide than FID. 

FID involves military deployment of counter-insurgency specialists. According to the US doctrinal manual, Joint Publication 3-22: Foreign Internal Defense (FID), these specialists occasionally get involved with the actual fighting.  Doctrine calls for a close working relationship between the Host Nation government and security specialists which could include diplomatic, information, intelligence, military, economic, and other specialties. A successful FID action suppresses actual violence. If combat operations are required, Host Nation security forces take the lead. FID is tasked with external support and training where required.

Definition
Formally, FID is defined as "Participation by civilian and military agencies of a government in any of the action programs taken by another government or other designated organization to free and protect its society from subversion, lawlessness, and insurgency."

Instruments of national power
The FID effort is a multinational and interagency effort requiring integration and synchronization of all instruments of national power.

The FID military instrument of national power supports other instruments of national power (diplomatic, information/intelligence, economic, etc.) to protect and enhance Host Nation security interests. Actions can include:
 Military engagement, 
 Security cooperation (SC), and 
 Deterrence

Nation assistance
Within this range of military operations, nation assistance (NA) is civil or military assistance (other than foreign humanitarian assistance [FHA]) rendered to a nation by US forces within that nation's territory during peacetime, crises or emergencies, or war, based on agreements mutually concluded between the United States and that nation. Nation assistance operations support the HN by promoting sustainable development and the growth of responsive institutions. The goal is to promote long-term regional stability. Nation assistance programs include:
 security assistance (SA), 
 humanitarian 
 civic assistance (HCA), and 
 foreign internal defense (FID).

Internal defense and development (IDAD) program

It is important to frame the US FID effort within the context of the US doctrine it supports and to understand how it fits into the HN Internal Defense and Development (IDAD) program. US military support to FID should focus on assisting an HN in anticipating, precluding, and countering threats or potential threats and addressing the root causes of instability. Thus, emphasis on internal developmental programs as well as internal defense programs when organizing, planning, and executing military support to US FID activities is essential. Although the FID operation is considered military engagement, security cooperation, and deterrence, FID may include or support operations from across the range of military operations to support the HN's IDAD strategy. Accordingly, US military operations supporting FID provide training, materiel, advice, or assistance to local forces executing an IDAD program, rather than US forces conducting IDAD military missions for the HN. Internal threats mean threats manifested within the internationally recognized boundaries of a nation. These threats can come from but are not limited to, subversion, insurgency (including support to insurgency), and/or criminal activities.

b. The focus of US FID efforts is to support the HN's internal defense and development (IDAD). IDAD is the full range of measures taken by a nation to promote its growth and protect itself from subversion, lawlessness, insurgency, terrorism, and other threats to its security. It focuses on building viable institutions that respond to the needs of society. It is important to understand that both FID and IDAD, although defined terms and used throughout this publication, are not terms used universally outside the Department of Defense (DOD). Other terms could be used to encompass what are called FID and IDAD herein.

c. Military engagement during FID supports the other instruments of national power through a variety of activities across the range of military operations. In some cases, direct military support may be necessary in order to provide the secure environment for "Although on the surface, FID [foreign internal defense] appears to be a relatively simple concept, that appearance is deceptive; FID is a much more nuanced and complicated operation than its definition at first implies. FID is often confused with or equated to training foreign forces when there is much more to it in reality." Lieutenant Colonel John Mulbury ARSOF [Army Special Operations Forces], General [Conventional] Purpose Forces and FID Special Warfare, January–February 2008 Chapter I I-2 JP 3-22 IDAD efforts to become effective. However, absent direction from the President or the Secretary of Defense (SecDef), US forces engaged in NA are prohibited from engaging in combat operations, except in self-defense.

d. From the US perspective, FID refers to the US activities that support an HN IDAD strategy designed to protect against subversion, lawlessness, insurgency, terrorism, and other threats to their security, consistent with US national security objectives and policies.

It is the main area for United States counter-insurgency doctrine, although other nations, such as France and the United Kingdom, have carried out FID missions. The FM 3-24 Counterinsurgency, defines counterinsurgency as:

In many respects, it is the mirror image of the US doctrine for guerrilla warfare, which in US Special Operations is called unconventional warfare:

 To support or shape the environment for the larger conventional campaign, such as WWII Resistance operations conducted before the Normandy invasion
 unilateral effort, generally conducted covertly, includes Afghanistan against the Soviets in the 1980s, and again in Afghanistan after the attacks of September 11, 2001.

Effective FID and partnership
FID exists only within a context of host nation (HN) internal defense and development (IDAD), where it can be a force multiplier for regional commanders concerned with counterinsurgency.  Insurgencies today are more likely to be transnational than in the past.

It has been a basic axiom that successful FID programs are real partnerships. According to Cordesman, a set of rules for establishing such partnerships include:

 Real security dialogue at the bilateral and regional level means listening and last personal relationships.
 Security cooperation should focus on security and stability, not political or social reform. Such efforts should recognize the legitimacy of different values and be the subject of a separate dialogue.
 Build trust by clearly seeking friend or ally's security.
 Focus on building local self-defense and deterrence capabilities, not presence or dependence.
 Help friends and allies build forces in their own way; do not "mirror image."
 Recognize the reality that other nations define threats and allies differently from the U.S.
 Arms sales must clearly benefit the buyer, not just the seller.
 Ensure sustainability, capability to operate own forces in own way.
 Responsive, time sensitive aid, deployment, sales, and transfers.

Especially when the HN government, the insurgency, and the FID force come from different cultures, careful thought needs to be given both to the way the parties perceive the rules, and the ways they communicate their agreement to one another. Steven Metz, of the US Army Strategic Studies Institute, observed:

Metz warns that the paradigm may have changed.

Insurgency matters today because it is linked to the phenomenon of transnational terrorism. Insurgents have long used terrorism in the operational sense, deterring those who supported the government and creating an environment of violence and insecurity to erode public trust in the regime. But now terrorism plays a strategic role as well. Insurgents can use terrorism as a form of long-range power projection against outsiders who support the government they are fighting. This could deter or even end outside assistance. It is easy to imagine, for instance, that the already fragile backing for American involvement in Iraq would erode even further if the Iraqi insurgents launched attacks in the United States. Even more important, an insurgent movement able to seize control of a state could support transnational terrorists. The idea is that insurgents have demonstrated an affinity for violence and extremism which would flavor their policies if they came to power.

He rejects the idea that transnational terrorism is uniquely Islamic.

It is less the chance of an insurgent victory which creates a friendly environment for transnational terrorism than persistent internal conflict shattering control and restraint in a state. During an insurgency, both the insurgents and the government focus on each other, necessarily leaving parts of the country with minimal security and control. Transnational terrorists exploit this. And protracted insurgency creates a general disregard for law and order. Organized crime and corruption blossom. Much of the population loses its natural aversion to violence. Thus a society brutalized and wounded by a protracted insurgency is more likely to spawn a variety of evils, spewing violent individuals into the world long after the conflict ends.

Participants in FID programs
No external force can guarantee success against an insurgency unless the people regard the Host Nation (HN) government as legitimate. Limited external support helped Ramon Magsaysay defeat the Hukbalahap insurgency in the Philippines, with one of the most important parts of that support being the availability of air transport so he could be visible in remote areas.  The Vietnam War showed that even a superpower cannot make an unresponsive and corrupt government succeed against insurgents, especially when the superpower has significant conflict in its internal decisionmaking. An ineffective HN government guarantees the failure of counterinsurgency.

The first part of this discussion discusses two parts of the "McCormick Magic Diamond" terms the "counterinsurgency force" (i.e., principally the HN government and closely aligned FID units) and the "international community" (i.e., nongovernmental organizations (NGO)) and other nation-states).

Diplomatic
There will almost always be a variety of other participants, which can include friendly neighbor states, states sharing a coalition, and nongovernmental organizations. At the intergovernmental level, the highest decisions will be reached between diplomats at the HN foreign ministry or department of state, with the ambassadors of the nations providing FID being key players. The diplomatic level sets the highest policies.

States that are generally strong still may need FID assistance for well-defined problems, especially problems where they lack skill and resources that they can, over time, acquire. For example, ASEAN is a Southeast Asian regional alliance including highly competent states such as Singapore. Nevertheless, they may need to develop additional resources ranging from port inspection to sea surveillance to advanced intelligence.

Nongovernmental organizations
The very conditions that may necessitate a stability operation or support operation—widespread human suffering, population movements, famine, human rights violations, and civil war—are also the conditions that attract the services of nongovernmental organizations (NGO) and private voluntary organizations (PVO). A PVO is a subset of NGO, and is a tax-exempt nonprofit that leverages expertise and private funding to address development challenges abroad. To work with them effectively, HN and FID personnel need to understand that each organization or agency has a different mandate, set of capacities, organizational design, and cultural orientation. Some may prefer not to work with military organizations, or with the personnel of certain other NGOs or nations.

NGOs and PVOs (as well as coalition partners) may require services from combat service support (CSS) units. The assistance may have been negotiated before the organization arrived in the area of operations, or the situation may create a sudden demand. Responsibilities may also include support of coalition members and representatives of NGOs.

Military

Western special operations forces are considered strategic assets with core missions including FID and UW. They may have other capabilities relevant to specific situations, such as demining. The United States Army Special Forces are among the most versatile organizations, but not all their capabilities may be needed for a specific FID situation. For example, the most urgent need might be for public health specialists or airfield construction crews, which operate on a level far beyond the medical or engineering specialists of a US Special Forces unit. Public health or construction organizations, however, have limited or no self-defense capability and will need protection in insecure areas.

FID models
There are multiple models of the strength and stability of nation-states, especially in the context of insurgency where they are detailed. Not all states need assistance to suppress insurgency, while in other cases, no external assistance is available. The latter was often the case when the insurgency was directed, by the native population, at a colonial power.

A key part of a foreign internal defense (FID) mission is that its goal is to enable the nation and its institutions to move into the realm of those states that both provide for their citizens and interact constructively with the rest of the world. Two broad categories of country need at least some aspects of FID assistance. The obvious category is of weak and failed states, but there are also needs in generally strong states that face specific problems such as terrorism, piracy, and illegal drugs.

This section includes a number of models that help recognize when either the preconditions for insurgency exist, or how insurgents are operating against the HN.  Through the various models, the need for security of the population is mentioned most often; without security, it is difficult to impossible to deal with other problems causing instability, such as public health or economy

The FID paradigm is inherently cooperative, with at least one nation helping strengthen the state. FID is a different approach than defense against external invasion or settling a major civil war. FID is never a quick process. The major power(s) uses nonmilitary and military means to increase the capability of the host nation (HN) to resist insurgency. FID includes the economic stabilization of host countries.

Myths and fallacies
The term Global War on Terror has been criticized, but there may be utility in examining a war not specifically on the tactic of terror, but in one or more, potentially cooperating insurgencies. "The utility of analyzing the war on terrorism using an insurgency/counterinsurgency conceptual framework. Additionally, the recommendations can be applied to the strategic campaign, even if it is politically unfeasible to address the war as an insurgency." Cordesman points out some of the myths in trying to have a worldwide view of terror:

 Cooperation can be based on trust and common values: One man's terrorist is another man's terrorist.
 A definition of terrorism exists that can be accepted by all.
 Intelligence can be freely shared.
 Other states can be counted on to keep information secure, and use it to mutual advantage.
 International institutions are secure and trustworthy.
 Internal instability and security issues do not require compartmentation and secrecy at national level.
 The "war on terrorism" creates common priorities and needs for action.
 Global and regional cooperation is the natural basis for international action.
 Legal systems are compatible enough for cooperation.
 Human rights and rule of law differences do not limit cooperation.
 Most needs are identical.
 Cooperation can be separated from financial needs and resources.

Social scientists, soldiers, and sources of change have been modeling insurgency for nearly a century, if one starts with Mao. Counterinsurgency models, not mutually exclusive from one another, come from  Kilcullen, McCormick,  Barnett and Eizenstat; see insurgency for the material that deals with factors that predispose toward insurgency.

Kilcullen's "Three Pillars"

Kilcullen gives a useful visual overview of an insurgency and counterinsurgency of the actors in the models, which generally agrees with a model represents home as a box defined by geographic, ethnic, economic, social, cultural, and religious characteristics. Inside the box are governments, counterinsurgent forces, insurgent leaders, insurgent forces, and the general population, which is made up of three groups:

 those committed to the insurgents
 those committed to the counterinsurgents
 those who simply wish to get on with their lives.

The three pillar model repeats later as part of the gaps to be closed to end an insurgency. "Obviously enough, you cannot command what you do not control. Therefore, unity of command (between agencies or among government and non-government actors) means little in this environment." Unity of command is one of the axioms of military doctrine change with the use of swarming:.

In Edwards swarming model, as in Kilcullen's mode, unity of command becomes "unity of effort at best, and collaboration or deconfliction at least."

As in swarming, Kilcullen "depends less on a shared command and control hierarchy, and more on a shared diagnosis of the problem [i.e., the distributed knowledge of swarms], platforms for collaboration, information sharing and deconfliction. Each player must understand the others' strengths, weaknesses, capabilities and objectives, and inter-agency teams must be structured for versatility (the ability to perform a wide variety of tasks) and agility (the ability to transition rapidly and smoothly between tasks)."

McCormick's "Magic Diamond"
McCormick's "Magic Diamond" model is designed as a tool for counterinsurgency, but develops a symmetrical view of the required actions for both the Insurgent and COIN forces to achieve success. In this way the counterinsurgency model can demonstrate how both the insurgent and COIN forces succeed or fail. The model's strategies and principle apply to both forces, therefore the degree the forces follow the model should have a direct correlation to the success or failure of either the Insurgent or COIN force.

The model depicts four key elements or players:

 Insurgent force
 Counterinsurgency force (i.e., the government)
 Population
 International community

All of these interact, and the different elements have to assess their best options in a set of actions:

 Gaining support of the population
 Disrupt opponent's control over the population
 Direct action against opponent
 Disrupt opponent's relations with the international community
 Establish relationships with the international community

Barnett's "connecting to the core"
In Thomas Barnett's paradigm,
the world is divided into a "connected core" of nations enjoying a high level of communications among their organizations and individuals, and those nations that are disconnected internally and externally. In a reasonably peaceful situation, he describes a "system administrator" force, often multinational, which does what some call "nation-building", but, most importantly, connects the nation to the core and empowers the natives to communicate—that communication can be likened to swarm coordination. If the state is occupied, or in civil war, another paradigm comes into play, which is generally beyond the scope of FID: the leviathan, a first-world military force that takes down the opposition regular forces. Leviathan is not constituted to fight local insurgencies, but major forces. Leviathan may use extensive swarming at the tactical level, but its dispatch is a strategic decision that may be made unilaterally, or by an established group of the core such as NATO or ASEAN.

FID can grow out of the functioning of the "system administrator", be that a single dominant country (e.g., France in Chad), or with a multinational group such as ECOMOG, the military arm of the Economic Community of West African States (ECOWAS), in Sierra Leone. In the Sierra Leonian situation, the primary Leviathan was Great Britain, with Operation Barras, which involved special reconnaissance, direct action, and hostage rescue.

Eizenstat and closing gaps
Stuart E. Eizenstat gives a broad view of FID involve closing "gaps", some of which can be done by military advisors and even combat assistance, but, even more broadly, helping the Host Nation (HN) be seen as responsive. To be viable, a state must be able to close three "gaps", of which the first is most important:

 Security – Protection "against internal and external threats, and preserving sovereignty over territory. If a government cannot ensure security, rebellious armed groups or criminal nonstate actors may use violence to exploit this security gap—as in Haiti, Nepal, and Somalia."
 Capacity – The most basic are the survival needs of water, electrical power, food and public health, closely followed by education, communications and a working economic system. "An inability to do so creates a capacity gap, which can lead to a loss of public confidence and then perhaps political upheaval. In most environments, a capacity gap coexists with—or even grows out of—a security gap. In Afghanistan and the Democratic Republic of the Congo, for example, segments of the population are cut off from their governments because of endemic insecurity. And in postconflict Iraq, critical capacity gaps exist despite the country's relative wealth and strategic importance."
 Legitimacy – Closing the legitimacy gap is more than an incantation of "democracy" and "elections", but a government that is perceived to exist by the consent of the governed, has minimal corruption, and has a working law enforcement and judicial system that enforce human rights.

Note the similarity between Eizenstat's gaps and Kilcullen's three pillars.

Cordesman and security
Other than brief "Leviathan" takedowns, security building appears to need to be regional, with logistical and other technical support from more developed countries and alliances (e.g., ASEAN, NATO). Noncombat military assistance in closing the security gap begins with training, sometimes in specialized areas such as intelligence. More direct, but still noncombat support, includes intelligence, planning, logistics and communications.

Anthony Cordesman notes that security requirements differ by region and state in region. Writing on the Middle East, he identified different security needs for specific areas, as well as the US interest in security in those areas.

 In North Africa, the US focus should be on security cooperation in achieving regional stability and in counterterrorism.
 In the Levant, the US must largely compartment security cooperation with Israel and cooperation with friendly Arab states like Egypt, Jordan, and Lebanon, but can improve security cooperation with all these states.
 In the Gulf, the US must deal with the strategic importance of a region whose petroleum and growing gas exports fuel key elements of the global economy.

It is well to understand that counterterrorism, as used by Cordesman, does not mean using terrorism against terrorism, but an entire spectrum of activities, nonviolent and violent, to disrupt an opposing terrorist organization. The French general, Joseph Gallieni, observed, while a colonial administrator in 1898,

Both Kilcullen and Eizenstat define a more abstract goal than does Cordesman. Kilcullen's security pillar is roughly equivalent to Eizenstat's security gap:

 Military security (securing the population from attack or intimidation by guerrillas, bandits, terrorists or other armed groups)
 Police security (community policing, police intelligence or "Special Branch" activities, and paramilitary police field forces).
 Human security, building a framework of human rights, civil institutions and individual protections, public safety (fire, ambulance, sanitation, civil defense) and population security.

Anthony Cordesman, while speaking of the specific situation in Iraq, makes some points that can be generalized to other nations in turmoil.  Cordesman recognizes some value in the groupings in Samuel P. Huntington's idea of the clash of civilizations, but, rather assuming the civilizations must clash, these civilizations simply can be recognized as actors in a multinational world. In the case of Iraq, Cordesman observes that the burden is on the Islamic civilization, not unilaterally the West, if for no other reason that the civilization to which the problematic nation belongs will have cultural and linguistic context that Western civilization cannot hope to equal.

National problems and transnational spillover
Developed and stable countries have their own reasons for helping HNs deal with insurgency, because insurgencies can have direct (e.g., terrorism, epidemic disease) or indirect (e.g., drug trade, economic instability in resources)  effects on them. While ideological or religious terrorism is most frequently mentioned, it is, by no means, the only multinational problem that FID addresses, starting at the national level. When one of these problems is present in a state, it is likely to cause transnational "spillover effects".

Problems include:

 Blood diamonds
 Illicit drugs
 Piracy
 Disease
 Terrorism
 Ethnic cleansing
 Economic instability

Not only HN, but regional conflicts threaten to widen gaps. "Pretending that the conflicts in  Afghanistan, Chechnya, Darfur, Iraq, Palestine and Sri Lanka are the problems of others or are going to solve themselves is not a solution. Some states, especially in the ASEAN group, can be quite strong, but still have difficulties with piracy, terrorism, and drug traffic. There are a number of intelligence-sharing arrangements among countries in this area and the US FID assistance needs can involve economically strong countries in other regions. "Nigeria is among the top ten exporters of crude oil to the United States. ... when rebel leaders in the oil-rich Niger delta vowed to launch an "all-out war on the Nigerian state," instability helped propel global oil prices to more than $50 per barrel.

Blood diamonds
Transnational criminal networks may use weak nations as sanctuaries for high-value, low-volume commodities such as diamonds FID forces may participate in identifying illegal "blood diamonds" that may be used to finance terrorism. Even more compact than drugs and easier to disguise, gem smuggling lends itself to air movement that may be detected with surveillance at the national or regional level.

Illicit drug trade
Drugs also are high-value and low-volume.  When a country's legitimate government is weak compared to its drug trade infrastructure, part of FID may be defeating that infrastructure, or, minimally, reducing its ability to corrupt or destroy government institutions.  The role of FID forces involves intelligence sharing, logistics and communications, assistance in planning operations, and training and equipping HN forces. Properly trained and equipped police and military forces can help close the security gap. Work with the World Health Organization and regional health groups work with the capacity gap.  Regional HN operations to interdict drug traffickers, destroy labs and seize drugs helps close the legitimacy gap by reducing the bribery of local officials.

Consistent with the restrictions on military organizations performing civilian law enforcement, such as the US Posse Comitatus Act, homeland and FID personnel can cooperate with partner nations (PN) in their counterdrug (CD) effort to disrupt the transport and/or transfer of illegal drugs into the US. Counterdrug (CD) is a high priority national security and international cooperation mission, with DOD functions and responsibilities based on statutory authority. The Armed Forces of the United States assist partner nations (PNs) in their CD efforts. Illicit drug trafficking, smuggling of every sort, and the regional and global movement of terrorists are closely linked by financial, political, and operational linkages.

US military resources can be used as part of a counter-drug (CD) component of a FID program. While these are most often focused on supply, they also can be used to interfere with drug shipment. Since the United States Department of Defense is the lead government agency of the USG for the detection and monitoring (DM) of aerial and maritime transit of illegal drugs into the US, the DM mission is performed with regularly appropriated funds, notwithstanding the possibility of incidental benefit to the HN. Such activities may include nonconfrontational intercepts for intelligence or communication purposes and gathering and processing of tactical intelligence from a variety of sources, including fixed and mobile surveillance assets and certain intelligence sharing. In a CD support role (subject to national policy and legislative guidance) DOD may offer certain direct support to HN CD personnel, and certain enhanced support to US civilian law enforcement agencies that may be operating in the HN, and to the Bureau of International Narcotics and Law Enforcement of the United States Department of State.

Without explicit direction from the Secretary of Defense, US forces engaged in CD activities may not engage in direct law enforcement activity. They may not directly participate in an arrest, search, seizure, or other similar activity. DOD personnel are not authorized to accompany HN forces on actual CD field operations or participate in any activities where hostilities are likely to occur. Other nations participating in the CD aspects of FID may operate under more permissive rules of engagement.

Piracy
Piracy is very real in the international waters of weak and failed states, such as Somalia. FID personnel may gather intelligence on pirate locations, and transmit this to warships able to intercept the pirate vessels. When pirates are active, providing FID supplies by water is impractical unless the transport vessels are armed, or travel in convoy.

Piracy also may feed into security violations at ports, and as a means by which terrorists transport personnel and materials.
An Organisation for Economic Co-operation and Development (OECD) study on the ownership and control of ships reports that anonymous ownership is more the rule than the exception. There are reports that 15 cargo ships are linked to al-Qaeda.

Disease
Bad health is a very real problem, especially from domestic conflict that displaces refugees across borders. HIV is the most obvious, especially in Africa, but it is not the only major concern.

Military health specialists, as distinct from special operations forces, can have an enormous impact. Training and equipping health and education facilities are key FID capabilities. While Special Forces medical personnel can deliver clinic services and train local workers, there is an entire spectrum of ways to use FID to enhance public health. As one example, the US Navy's Medical Research Unit No. 3 has been active in Egypt since the Second World War. Located next to the Abbassia Fever Hospital, the oldest and largest fever hospital in the Middle East, it does research with Egyptian personnel and scientific clinicals throughout Africa and Southwest Asia. It works closely with the Egyptian Ministry of Health and Population, the US National Institutes of Health, the World Health Organization, the U.S Agency for International Development and the US Centers for Disease Control and Prevention. NAMRU-3 is a WHO Collaborating Center for HIV and Emerging Infectious Diseases.

Terrorism
Organized transnational terrorists can flourish in weak states. A globally oriented group using terrorist methods can coexist with a local insurgency, or perhaps in the country that offers sanctuary to a border-crossing insurgency in a neighboring state.  Developed country terrorism programs can benefit from FID in weak states, by strengthening those states, with due regard to human rights and the rule of law. FID can complement the global war on
terrorism by reducing these contributing factors. The defensive measures of anti-terrorism (AT) and offensive counterterrorism efforts can be part of the FID program developed for a HN.

Motivating states against global terrorist groups is, in the US, principally the responsibility of the Department of State. Effective FID programs, however, can improve public perceptions of both the HN and the country(ies) providing FID resources. and facilitate more active HN policies to combat terrorism. Military-to-military contacts can help make HN officials advocates of potential operations against terrorist capabilities.

In many cases, measures increasing the capacity of a state to fight terrorism also will strengthen its overall IDAD program. These measures can include the following:

 Developing the ability of the HN to track illicit financial transactions, break funding streams for criminal and insurgent groups, and prosecute their members. This may involve greater USHN cooperation in developing regulated financial institutions. See financial intelligence (FININT)
 Ensuring that HN security personnel have access to appropriate equipment and training to conduct all phases of combating terrorism operations.
 Training personnel at entry and exit points (including airports, seaports, and border crossings) to identify and apprehend individuals and materials being used by international terrorist groups.
 Assisting HN security and intelligence agencies to be included into international networks that can share information on terrorist activities.
 Developing effective judicial systems, and minimizing corruption and intimidation of HN officials.

Ethnic cleansing
FID specialists in Information Operations can help reduce the intensity of ethnic struggle. They have a range of techniques, from presenting things advantageous to all sides, to shutting down inflammatory propaganda outlets.

Nonmilitary actions in closing gaps
While the usual focus is on the military component of FID, the US FID joint doctrinal manual makes it clear that FID must be coordinated with all parts of a host government's scope. Doctrinally, the overall program should be under the United States Department of State, or equivalent Foreign Ministry for other countries' FID programs.  In the sixties a presidentially appointed ambassador, otherwise
known as chief of mission (COM), heads the embassy.
But as multiple US agencies have moved into embassies over the years, the COM's authority has actually declined. Not many Army officers realize that COMs have little or no staff in the military sense; often they have little oversight of funds moving through other agencies in the embassy, and they have little or no planning capability, which sometimes leads to culture clashes with US military forces in country. More worrisome, under current rules COMs often have little to say about military operations in their countries, overpowered as they are by regional combatant command planning staffs and military teams that move in and out. Under President John F. Kennedy, COMs had explicit authority over Military Assistance Advisory Groups (MAAG), which were part of the ambassador's "country team." That authority has disappeared over the years ... 

In the US context, many of these functions, when provided by government, are the responsibility of the United States Agency for International Development (USAID), whose main missions are grouped as:

 Global Development Alliance
 Economic Growth, Agriculture, and Trade
 Global Health
 Democracy, Conflict, and Humanitarian Assistance.

Economic
There are at least two components of economic development: debt relief and new development. Most of the debt relief activity will be by nonmilitary personnel, other than perhaps an occasional audit. New development, however, can involve engineering and other relevant military skills.

Not all models consider economics a key gap. The World Bank observes, however, that "low-income countries are about 15 times more susceptible to internal conflict than countries in the Organisation for Economic Co-operation and Development (OECD). Helping poor nations to stabilize and diversify their economies—empowering them to fight poverty and meet popular expectations—must be a vital facet of the developed and developing world's efforts to avoid state collapse. The role of trade, along with the issues of protecting nascent economic sectors, is a true challenge. "Agricultural trade disputes were a key issue in the stalled Doha Round.  At the same time, the United States must unilaterally give poor countries access to its markets through initiatives such as the African Growth and Opportunity Act."

"The governments of major developing countries must play a large part in designing and carrying out new strategies. For proof, one need only look at the radically different international responses to the locally initiated New Partnership for Africa's Development (NEPAD) (which was embraced) and the Bush administration's Greater Middle East Initiative (which was not)." Reconfigured, the G-20 (i.e., members of the G8 and major emerging markets such as Brazil, India, Indonesia, Saudi Arabia, and South Africa) could play a vital role in brokering consensus on a wide range of intractable political and security issues. The G-20 has already established itself as a key voice in global economic policy, and with an elevated profile it could address political and security affairs as well.

Debt relief
Especially poor nations are under a crushing debt load, and international organizations such as the World Bank and International Monetary Fund have worked on debt relief, within a well-managed economic framework, to allow those countries to reallocate funds from debt service to development activities. Under this IMF program, 22 nations have shown sufficient development progress that they have passed the "completion point" at which lenders have agreed to forgive loans.

Development
Kilcullen's economic pillar includes:

 near-term component of immediate humanitarian relief
 longer-term programs for development assistance across a range of agricultural, industrial and commercial activities
 assistance in effective resource and infrastructure management
 construction of key infrastructure systems

All these components need to be tailored to the HN capacity to absorb spending, as well as efforts to increase absorptive capacity, underpin other development activities. "One of the fundamental reasons for the US military's success in reacting to emergencies is its almost limitless supply of contingency funding. US development agencies have no comparable capacity. Congress should give the president a "country-in-transition" fund to finance unforeseen reconstruction or peacekeeping operations ... [the world needs] cohesive rapid response unit, a centralized pool of interagency experts on state building—the rule of law, governance, and economic reform—trained to work together and able to deploy rapidly, unencumbered by bureaucratic inertia, to crisis spots." Language and cultural knowledge gaps alone mean that this cannot be a unilateral US operation.

Military assistance
Economic support can include the provision of foreign military financing under security assistance. Providing military equipment, however, must be done in a manner that the insurgents cannot exploit in their propaganda, calling the country or countries supporting the government "merchants of death" or the like.

Health
All special operations personnel have medical training beyond basic first aid, with the US Army Special Forces medical specialists closer to the paramedic or physician assistant levels. The engineering specialists often can construct wells and irrigation systems.

Additional deployment of health services have, historically, proven to be a valuable low-risk asset to support FID programs. These are usually noncontroversial and cost-effective.  The focus of such initiatives are not curative, but rather long-term developmental programs that are sustainable by the HN. These activities are targeted toward the health problems facing the HN military in conjunction with other US agencies, civilian health initiatives.

While it can be entirely appropriate to provide medical supplies to local clinics, there have been cases where either local personnel diverted some of the supplies to the insurgents, or the insurgents expropriated them. The FID or HN health specialists should periodically audit medical supply inventory and compare them with health records, to see if use is consistent with the record. The records and supplies may differ for simply administrative reasons, which can become a teaching opportunity for medical records.

When mass immunization programs are part of the health services in FID, it can be wise to avoid extreme measures to keep insurgents from receiving immunization. Increasing overall population immunity benefits all in the country, especially if the insurgency ends. In disaster situations, it also can provide long-term benefits not to check identification as closely as might be done in other situations.

For countries that have had long civil wars or other conflicts that left a legacy of land mines, prosthetic services, regretfully, may be necessary—and leave long-term friendships.

Agriculture and nutrition
A lesson learned by accident came from the Marine Combined Action Platoons in Vietnam, where young Marines who came from 4-H Club farm competition turned out to be experts on animal husbandry. In some FID situations, there can be an enormous benefit, both for health through proper diet and for economic development, to bring in experts on sustainable agriculture, and resources that the local inhabitants can use independently, such as improved breeding stock.
In a developing country, some approaches to improving agricultural productivity may have short-term benefits but long-term problems. Inappropriate use of antibiotics, as animal growth stimulants, both makes the local economy dependent on outside drug manufacturers, and also can increase bacterial resistance to treatment. Genetically modified seed that will not propagate itself also makes an agricultural economic sector dependent on indefinite outside assistance.

Public health, research and advanced treatment
Special operators, as well trained as they may be in community health, are not professional epidemiologists. A number of infectious diseases are increasing (see CIA transnational health and economic activities for projections), and, without aggressive prevention, may destroy developing economies. A critical FID role may be to bring the appropriate specialists where they are needed, and to give them physical security.

A major worldwide goal of public health is eradication of infectious diseases, eradication being a technical term meaning that the disease is extinct in the wild, and may or may not exist in laboratories. One disease, smallpox, has been eradicated, and that took close to 200 years. Eradication of other diseases, however, is closer, and mass immunization programs as part of FID may be a major tool.  Trained FID and HN personnel also may be able to identify and quarantine sporadic cases.

Polio, for example, is close to being the second disease, after smallpox, to being eradicated. It is endemic in three countries: Afghanistan, Nigeria and Pakistan, but has been eliminated from Europe, the Americas, the Western Pacific (including China), India and Australia. Apparently, a Nigerian strain managed to get into Sudan, and appeared in displaced persons camps in Kenya.

FID operations
In cooperation with the HN, the FID organization needs to define its initial set of operations, accepting that needs will change over time. No single operational plan will fit all HN environments, and it is wise to consider the various counterinsurgency models and see if the proposed plan will work to fill the identified gaps, weaknesses, and disconnection

A representative set of steps for the FID force is:

 Security Operations – "The first priority for any government facing an insurgency is to establish a secure environment." The FID force role will vary here. The HN government has the greatest credibility when it can conduct these operations, respecting human rights, on its own.
 Gain Popular Support – "Gaining and maintaining the support of the population is the overall goal and path to victory since the population is the center of gravity, therefore it is imperative for long-term success that the population views the government as legitimate. It is equally important for the US effort to be viewed as legitimate versus being viewed as an occupier or supporting a puppet government."
 Gain International Support – "It is also important for the government's internal defense efforts to be legitimized, accepted and supported by the international community." The more the military and nonmilitary FID organization is multinational, the easier it may be to gain this support.
 Defeat Insurgents – "If done correctly, the first three lines should de-legitimize the insurgents and lead to their lasting defeat. This line will attack the hard-core insurgents. Some may succumb to offers of amnesty, but most will need to be killed or captured through offensive operations." Again, it is most desirable HN personnel do this.
 Develop Host Nation Internal Security – Internal security forces, such as local and national police forces, key facility protection corps, diplomat security personnel, coast guard, criminal investigation, paramilitary forces for counterinsurgency, local and national level special weapons and tactics capabilities will be necessary to defeat the internal threat as a law enforcement matter." If coalition combat forces have been used, "as the internal security forces are trained, the coalition will transition to only protecting the nation from external threats until such a time as the actual national military force is trained, equipped, and can conduct unilateral operations."

Cordesman points out that military force, used to excess, may be worse for the long-term situation than not engaging the insurgents at all. When a shell leaves the barrel of a cannon, its effects may be more than physical; it may explode into "real time political and media dimension, "Effects based warfare" depends on political effect, not just military ones. Tactical victories can be meaningless without political, ideological, information, and media dominance.

Especially in areas of high population density, civilian casualties, collateral property damage, and injuries from "friendly fire" can have enormous political effects. Operations in civilian areas are steadily more political and sensitive. Their planning must include politically and culturally appropriate solutions for interrogations, detainees, and prisoners.

In both the city and country, HN troops will be closer allies if they have the same protection and undergo the same risks as the FID troops. This can present difficulties when FID personnel are forbidden from combat operations, but there is a very delicate line between live-fire training and combat.  Another important morale issue is that the HN feels that the FID personnel share the risk with them, with both having equivalent force protection and risk in assignments.

Planning staff
HNs vary greatly in the extent of their experience as professional military staff. Insurgents also may have well-trained staff.

One of the key roles of a staff is avoiding mission creep. While the top leadership may have a vision of a desired outcome, one of the staff responsibilities is examining the practicality of that vision. Staff officers may be able to convert a vision of the future into a realistically phased plan to reach that future objective.

Mission creep can develop in different ways, with the inappropriate planning coming from outside or inside the FID units. Either the HN or the FID force may see great human suffering, and want to relieve it. Rushing into action can "interfere with impartiality as well as undermine long-term programs."  One type happens when the units receive missions for which they were not trained or equipped. For example, in Somalia, the original UN force was established for humanitarian services and limited peacekeeping. Without obtaining additional resources judged needed by the on-scene commanders and staff, they took on a peace enforcement mission.

With the best of intentions, a unit may take on more than is allowed in the current mandate and mission. "An example would be if a commander directed execution of civil action projects that fall outside his authority. Rebuilding structures, training local nationals, and other activities may be good for the local population, but they may be beyond the mandate and mission. At the same time, FID and HN commanders need to recognize when they lack critical resources, or if their rules of engagement are inadequate for a rapidly developing situation. When the on-scene UN commander in Rwanda, Gen. Romeo Dallaire asked UN headquarters for freedom to act, it was denied due to the interpretation of UN resolutions. Hindsight is always easy, but the catastrophe that took place might have been averted had Dallaire been able to carry out certain actions, including disabling or destroying of broadcast facilities used for inflammatory propaganda, as was done early in Bosnia.

Infrastructure
It is fruitless to do detailed planning for things not within the capabilities of the HN and FID organization. For example, plans that call for the placement of forces not accessible by roads, or where the roads are unsafe, will not be practical unless the forces can reach their destinations by air or water.

When air or water movement is needed, there need to be aircraft or watercraft, as well people and equipment for maintaining them. There may need to be navigational aids on the course or at the destination, or one of the first requirements is planning to install them. Especially with air transport, there either must be a means of refueling aircraft  along the path or at the destination. If there is no refueling capability at the destination, the aircraft must cut into their cargo capacity so that they carry enough fuel for the return trip; this is a serious limitation on transport flights from Lagos, Nigeria to El Fasher airport in Darfur, Sudan.

Legitimacy and government
In the gap model, closing the legitimacy gap provides a framework for constructive HN activity. Kilcullen calls this gap the political pillar.

By whatever legitimacy comes when "ensuring that rule of law to protect property and the right of the public ... move towards some form of centrist, moderate political pluralism. A legitimate government has to close all three gaps. Leaders for life, hereditary presidents, one party systems, and monarchies with captive political parties or none, all help breed extremism"; extremism flourishes when gaps widen.

Kilcullen measures success in this area by the amount of support that is visibly mobilized by "takeholders in support of the government," [marginalizing] opposition outside the law..[and] further the rule of law. A key element is the building of institutional capacity in all agencies of government and non-government civil institutions, and social re-integration efforts such as the disarming, demobilization and reintegration (DDR)  of combatants."

Disarming, demobilization and reintegration: end state
Disarming can have enormous symbolism, as with the Independent International Commission on Decommissioning in Northern Ireland. There may well be situations where an insurgency will not hand over its arms to the government, but will accept face-saving measures such as having a third party verify that the weapons are no longer a threat. Reintegration may mean that people perceived as having been involved in violence still can reenter the political process.

Like the security pillar for military forces, the political pillar is the principal arena for diplomatic and civil governance assistance efforts — although, again, civil agencies play a significant role in the security and economic pillars also.

"Transparency—in a developing government's decision-making, its allocation of budgetary funds, and its administration of the rule of law—must also be promoted. Perceived transparency and the reduction of corruption were key to the success of Ramon Magsaysay in creating a viable government in the Philippines. That El Salvador and Nicaragua are negotiating free trade agreements is another mark of success.

Limits to intervention
This section bears the title of Townsend Hoopes' best-known book. In 2004, of a seminar that brought a group of Muslim students to the US, he observed "A vital point here is that the realities of modernity (technical, social, political) are inexorable. They cannot be wished away, which means that traditional societies are faced with a crucial choice: to adjust, to adapt or to risk steady decline and perhaps ultimate disappearance. Given this daunting paradigm, the genuine enthusiasm for America shown by our 21 Muslim guests was a heartening sign. They seemed impressed with the depth of our national commitment to human freedom and individual opportunity, and the stability of our institutions, both governmental and private. Several declared that exposure to America had reinforced their determination to work for social change in their own countries. Two Pakistani women, both law students, said they planned to devote their lives to fighting for broader women's rights at home. One young man said it was his ambition to become his country's prime minister.

No matter how strongly a Leviathan may wish to do so, it "cannot simply avoid or wish away dealing with local elites, for ultimately their actions, not those of the [external power], will strengthen or undermine institutions. Money, especially money given to governments for their help against an external enemy, cannot buy legitimacy." At the height of the Cold War, US foreign aid went to dictators perceived helpful in the fight against communism, but doing little to promote broad-based development.

Anti-Soviet activities in Afghanistan left it in a civil war.  The failure of the French and other nations to question the 1955 State of Vietnam referendum left a Southern government without widely perceived legitimacy, and a Northern government with authoritarian rule but a certain degree of public support. "The bloody civil war consumed Afghanistan, paving the way for the Taliban and al Qaeda to take control of the government ... In attempting to end foreign conflicts quickly, policymakers must avoid planting the seeds of future instability ... developed state policymakers must be candid about the long-term nature of the state-building enterprise. This may seem politically unpalatable, but there is no excuse for launching limited engagements in countries mired in political and economic chaos. If the United States [or any external power] cannot sustain its engagement, it would do better not to intervene at all.

Where a problem involves economics, such as drugs in Latin America or diamonds in West Africa, other nations and civilizations have to work on the demand side, rather than requiring the HN to destroy what may have become an integral part of its economy.

Legitimacy is culturally defined
Neither isolation nor indulgence alone can meaningfully affect an elite's stance. A "tough love" toward elites may be needed to have them accept responsibility while increasing a culturally appropriate model of public participation. Elites in the weak nations world must recognize they cannot survive without contributing to the building of sustainable civil societies. While its long-term effect has yet to be determined, Afghans for a Civil Society demonstrates some potentially relevant principles. Its focus is on "community empowerment and citizens to play a greater role in determining Afghanistan's destiny. ACS is committed to increasing public participation in the decision-making process through democracy building, policy development and independent media." ACS put its headquarters not in Kabul, the national capital, but in Kandahar, the Taliban stronghold when they were in control.

Cordesman uses much the same argument as Eizenstat's legitimacy gap by saying "Algeria, Egypt, and Syria have already shown that "long wars" fought on this basis may bring the threat under partial control but cannot defeat it. If the US has pushed too hard, too quickly, and sometimes for the wrong thing, the Islamic leader that tries to defeat Islamic extremism by blocking or delaying reform, or making concessions to Islamic extremism, is guilty of committing self-inflicted wounds to his own faith and country—a failure far worse than any failure by Western states."

When a society suffers terrorism, it needs to recognize its own responsibilities, rather than shifting blame to outside groups. In no way does this absolve groups from committing acts of terror, but the FID paradigm recognizes that completed acts of terrorism widen the security gap; the Marxist guerrilla theoretician Carlos Marighella specifically aimed at the security gap. FID is intended both to assist the HN in developing direct measures to prevent and mitigate acts, but it also recognizes that the HN needs to carry out information operations that show the acts to be contrary to the general interests of the population. "To be credible in such messages, the HN government, as well as other policy influencers such as clerics, educators, politicians and media, need to condemn the acts while recognizing grievances ... They ultimately will be more important than internal security forces and counterterrorism campaigns. " Note that counterterrorism differs from counterterror, the latter being the use of terrorist methods against the insurgents. See Is there a role for counterterror?.

Even though Barnett speaks of problem nations as disconnected from the core, even failed states have some access to electronic communications, which means that the HN needs to respond quickly to the messages and claims of responsibility issues with attacks ..."Steady progress towards meeting popular needs and goals is equally important. Such progress may often be slow, and change will normally have to be evolutionary. But it must be a constant and publicly credible pursuit that leaders are seen to push forward. Extremists have capitalized on the dissatisfaction on the "street" with their economic, political, and economic situation—the steady decay of public services, corruption, and the narrow distribution of income.

The West must also understand that Western institutions cannot be transplanted into a social context for which they were not defined. Western observers also must understand that even fair elections, if the elected government cannot close gaps, are moot. The elites, therefore, need to envision the form of legitimacy that works in their culture. Many Asian societies, for example, are more concerned with common social goals than Western individualism. When the problem is radical Islam, the West must reinforce local reform efforts and avoid being seen as meddling in countries' internal affairs by supporting secular over religious Islamists, driving reform from the outside, or trying to change the Islamic character of Islamic countries."

Terrorism can never be totally eliminated as a tactic, but the ideology that drives organizations like Al-Qa'ida can be discredited and isolated. Support for extremism is still extremely marginal in weak nations. Terrorists killing innocent civilians have tarred the image of their broader civilization, and have destroyed the livelihood of nations like Iraq and Afghanistan. Poll after poll has shown that people in the Muslim worlds want moderate alternatives to the status quo, if their political, religious, and intellectual leaders will actually provide them." It is no accident that groups such as Hezbollah provide social services, with a message that the HN government cannot.

Role of counterterrorism
One of the challenges to a government intending to be seen as legitimate is the extent to which it can use what is often counterterror: selective assassination. This is not a black-and-white choice, as in the WWII examples of Reinhard Heydrich and Isoroku Yamamoto. Both were uniformed and identifiable, but Yamamoto was a member of the military while Heydrich was a government official. Lynn asks, "In a struggle for legitimacy founded on justice, can a government execute its opponents without trial? That was what assassination of insurgent leaders amounted to in El Salvador and Vietnam."

In a counterinsurgency situation, the perception of the government (i.e., McCormick's CF) violating the human rights of the population causes Eisenstat's legitimacy gap to widen. The Phoenix program in South Vietnam was criticized for a lack of precision in its targeting, and caused a further loss in legitimacy of the government, regardless of the damage done to the Viet Cong infrastructure. Marighella recommended that urban guerillas deliberately provoke the government into overreaction, as a means of reducing its legitimacy; the doctrine of having FID trainers counsel respect for human rights has pure military, not just humanitarian, justification.

With strong intelligence, there may be a justification for targeted killing of clearly identified leaders and key specialists.  When governments go farther into terror and torture, however, experience has shown that its effect rebounds both on their legitimacy and onto their personnel.

Population and Resource Control
One important element of a legitimate government is to gain control over the population and resources of the country. The US Special Forces Counterinsurgency Manual states that US Special Forces can advise and assist the host nation using the following control measures:

 Security Forces (see Direct Combat Role).
 Restrictions – "Rights on the legality of detention or imprisonment of personnel (for example, habeas corpus) may be temporarily suspended. This measure must be taken as a last resort, since it may provide the insurgents with an effective propaganda theme."
 Legal considerations – "In countries where government authorities do not have wide latitude in controlling the population ... emergency legislation may include a form of martial law permitting government forces to search without warrant, to detain without bringing formal charges, and to execute other similar actions."

The US SF Counterinsurgency Manual also heavily references psychological operations (PSYOP) as a means to make FID acceptable to the general population of the host nation "by relating the necessity of controls to their safety and well-being." The aim of PSYOP during FID operations is to increase the perceived legitimacy of the foreign presence and of the host government.

Indirect military support operations
Indirect support operations emphasize the principle of HN self-sufficiency. "Indirect support focuses on building strong national infrastructures through economic and military capabilities that contribute to self-sufficiency. FID personnel contribute to indirect support through security cooperation guidance, delivering through security assistance (SA), supplemented by multinational exercises, exchange programs, and selected joint exercises.

Troop equipping and training
FID personnel need to be prepared to deliver training to a wide range of HN personnel, from graduates of first world staff and war colleges, to highly trained special operations forces (SOF) to those totally untrained in the specific area where the FID program is located. Training delivery can include institutional training (including exchanges among national military colleges), on-the-job training, and unit-conducted  individual and collective training will be required.

Those who deliver training must exemplify both military skills and cultural sensitivity. While one's own country might consider searching after-action reviews a recognized learning experience, such techniques are counterproductive in countries where even one-on-one direct criticism is insulting, and even more so if criticism is delivered in front of third parties. Especially in intelligence and psychological operations, the FID and HN personnel should recognize they can learn from one another.

Logistics
In the absence of specific enabling legislation or orders, logistic support operations are limited by US law and usually consist of transportation or limited maintenance support.  Other nations will have their own policies, but any FID force needs to avoid making the HN dependent on it for logistical services that the HN could do. Some HNs are sufficiently wealthy to be able to hire foreign contractors, but this practice also should be avoided.

Highly skilled contractors may be useful as trainers, but their long-term use does not encourage the HN building its own set of skills. Third-country nationals also may present a security problem.

There can be times, however, where the country or countries providing FID resources can make an enormous difference at a key time, as, for example, with heavy airlift or sealift. For example, while US troops are not on the ground in Darfur, African Union peacekeepers are being flown from Kigali, Rwanda and Abuja, Nigeria by US transport aircraft.

Information operations
There is a strong emphasis on guiding the HN to do psychological operations, not simply to keep the noncombat role of the foreign force, but also the reality that HN personnel will understand language and cultural nuances far better than foreigners. For example, a very effective leaflet during Operation Desert Storm was distasteful and even offensive to many Americans, because they showed men walking while holding hands "The Arabs loved them as they showed the solidarity of the soldiers, hand in hand." To have Arab men hold hands symbolizes friendship, not any sexual message that Americans perceived.

For propaganda used in FID, there are multiple audiences, often with different perspectives. The wrong leaflet or broadcast sent to the wrong group can be counterproductive. In US FID doctrine, targets are identified as:

 Insurgents – "Create dissension, disorganization, low morale, subversion, and defection within insurgent forces, as well as help discredit them." A leaflet intended to strengthen the resolve of HN military forces might be perceived as demonstrating weakness of the latter vis-a-vis the insurgents.
 Civilian populace – "Gain, preserve, and strengthen civilian support for the HN government and its counterinsurgency programs." Too strong a military emphasis, regarding actions of either side, can be frightening.
 Military forces – Strengthen military support, with emphasis on building and maintaining the morale of the HN forces. "Avoid anything that can be turned against HN forces by insurgents."
 Neutral elements – "Gain the support of uncommitted groups inside and outside the HN."
 External hostile powers – "Convince hostile foreign [groups] the insurgency will fail."

Direct military support not involving combat operations
External military forces assigned to FID can provide direct support not involving combat operations. Where security assistance is funded from outside the military, such direct support is funded by the FID-providing nation's military budget, generally do not involve providing equipment, and may not involve direct training of the host country's forces by the nation providing FID assistance. The external nation may train internal trainers, and work with the host nation in civil-military operations.

Civil-military operations, under the FID model, include providing services to the local population. Jointly providing such services indirectly trains the local military in skills including logistics, preventive and reactive medicine, communications, and intelligence operations.  Realistically, the FID force will retain some self-defense capability, although geopolitical considerations may make that quite low-profile.

Direct support (not involving combat operations) involve the use of US forces providing direct assistance to the HN civilian populace or military. They differ from SA in that they are joint- or Service-funded, do not usually involve the transfer of arms and equipment, and do not usually but may include training local military forces.

Direct support operations are normally conducted when the HN has not attained self-sufficiency and is faced with social, economic, or military threats beyond its capability to handle. Assistance will normally focus on civil-military operations (primarily, the provision of services to the local populace), psychological operations, communications and intelligence sharing, and logistic support. The decision to conduct US combat operations in FID operations is the President's and serves only as a temporary solution until HN forces are able to stabilize the situation and provide security for the populace. In all cases, US combat operations support the HN IDAD program and remain strategically defensive in nature.

Communications
Some countries have essentially no communications infrastructure, and may need basic fixed-station to fixed-station radio, all the way up to secure mobile communications. In many situations, by adding communications security features to the military sites, a new or upgraded telephone system, including cellular telephony, can meet many non-combat military requirements.

Portable, robust communications are needed for military ground operations. There will also be needs for air to ground and air-to-air communications. When operating with multinational coalitions, or with foreign nation intelligence systems, the appropriate HN personnel will need communications interoperable with those systems.

Intelligence
The goal of intelligence sharing is to make the HN independent. Clearly, not every HN can afford space-based systems and other advanced, expensive technology. Advanced technologies, for security reasons, may not be appropriate to make available, in raw form, to third countries. Decisions on what can be shared and should be shared will involve the HN, the FID nation(s) country teams, the relevant combatant command, and the intelligence community.

When sensitive intelligence is provided, appropriate security needs to be in place, involving counterintelligence, other relevant security, and police organizations of all the relevant nations. Counterintelligence elements can provide this support with HN military counterintelligence elements, security service, and police forces when deployed in support of FID operations.

Early in the relationship, FID personnel, including appropriate specialists, will evaluate the HN intelligence capability, including appropriate secure communications, and recommend an architecture and implementation plan. Training in planning and executing intelligence operations can be provided.

Urban intelligence issues
Marighella speaks of the urban environment as being as or more concealing than the jungle. Walls, roofs, and other structural features interrupt line-of-sight (LOS) and make overhead imagery of less value in urban areas than in others. Such barriers preclude penetration by many sensors. There may be a limited capability provided by advanced thermal sensors, and, if available, penetrating radar, typically from airborne or spaceborne senseors that are not readily available.

What is in the open or under visible camouflage nets elsewhere is completely hidden within structures during urban contingencies (i.e., defeating conventional imagery intelligence IMINT) Further, movement of units is less frequently evident. Well-trained organizations minimize exterior activities; their soldiers remain within buildings to the maximum extent possible to reduce detection. Vehicles leave few signs of their passage on asphalt and concrete, unlike in other areas where their tracks can be seen in dirt or compressed foliage. The same LOS obstacles that interfere with friendly force communications block signal-collection efforts. The city foe will in some in stances employ local telephone systems, cellular networks, or other communications systems for which friendly force military SIGINT capabilities were not designed.  Such challenges mean that intelligence analysis during urban contingencies relies more on human intelligence (HUMINT) than is the norm.

Combat service support (CSS) units are among the most dispersed and omnipresent in any area of operations, their soldiers are potentially valuable HUMINT collectors. Guards assigned to specific posts will quickly become very familiar with the area around their posts and the routines associated with that terrain.  CSS drivers, men and women manning water purification sites, and others with frequent noncombatant contact should all receive training as intelligence collectors. They need to know their intelligence reporting responsibilities and have, consistent with security, a good idea of their command's intelligence requirements. These may be new ideas for even the combat service support troops of major powers, but it may be essential to teach the HN's personnel as well. Such training will consume resources, but is necessary, as is training CSS headquarters personnel when to pass information to the intelligence staff.

Reports will have to be monitored, compiled, consolidated, and disseminated to not only intelligence nodes but also operational units with an immediate need to see specific items. The inordinate reliance on HUMINT magnifies the role of the CSS soldier as intelligence collector during urban operations. Neither the benefits nor the costs have heretofore been fully recognized

Human rights and HUMINT
When the intelligence support involves HUMINT, human rights education must be given, and FID personnel are required to report abuses.

Intelligence sharing
Where drugs or other materials are shipped by air, radar systems, both ground- and air-based, while powerful, are relatively straightforward to provide. The actual radar need not be operated by the HN or even in their country; the radar can send its information to a remote intelligence center.

More difficult are situations where the countries asking for support, such as ASEAN and allies both can offer sensitive HUMINT, but want to exchange for SIGINT from the US or allies such as Australia. These exchanges can be immensely valuable, but both sides may feel the need to sanitize detailed sources.

Aviation support
One of the more challenging FID roles is that of aviation, given that the US Air Force has long emphasized strategic attack and the de-emphasis of airpower's supporting functions have contributed to a doctrinal void regarding airpower's role in counterinsurgency. Four airpower functions define the broad scope of airpower's role in fighting insurgents and terrorists, three of which can be noncombat:

 air mobility – Often extremely valuable, but on the edge of combat operations when HN personnel are flown to a combat zone.
 intelligence, surveillance, and reconnaissance (ISR)
 information operations (IO) – Not just broadcasts and leaflet drops, but air transport of government officials to remote areas can be used to improve HN information dissemination efforts and to provide a strong symbol of government legitimacy and resolve. For instance, the Philippine secretary of defense during the Huk rebellion, Ramon Magsaysay, frequently traveled by air to visit remote barrios and frontline units to boost morale and inform the public of new government reform policies. Air mobility can transport specialists and technicians to remote areas in order to provide on-site training and assistance in areas such as public services management, medical care, sanitation and hygiene, agriculture, and school administration.  Furthermore, air mobility can be used to transport construction equipment, supplies, and personnel to remote areas in support of public works programs such as housing construction, power generation, and transportation infrastructure improvements. In addition, air mobility can address political alienation and disenfranchisement by extending the electoral process to outlying areas.
 counterland – close air support would fall into the combat operations category.

Direct combat role
Deciding to extend FID to direct combat against an internal foe is made at the highest level of government of the country providing the FID personnel, and in keeping with that country's laws. The first levels of such a role could still be limited to logistics, intelligence, communications, and other combat support and combat service support roles that free the host nation forces to do the actual fighting.

Combat operations may be authorized that are limited to force protection, advising or leading combat operations as on-the-job training, and, very selectively, independent operations. Within the scope of independent operations may be low-intensity operations such as special reconnaissance. Direct action might be authorized to stop immediate terrorist threats, possibly to the country providing FID, or to neutralize WMD.

Depending on the potential infiltration of the HN forces, the FID force might keep control of heavy weapons, combat aircraft, and other sensitive, potent hardware.

Historically, one of the first missions for special operations forces was unconventional warfare (UW), or training and leading guerrillas in occupied countries. In WWII, this was a mission of the UK-US-French Jedburgh teams in occupied Europe.  Shortly after the end of the war, US and UK advisors worked with Greek and Turkish forces. After the war, and the organization of US Army Special Forces, the first deployments went to Europe to operate guerrillas when the expected Warsaw Pact invasion overran Europe.

See History below for French, British, and US developments after World War II.

Fire support
If FID forces take part in combat, one of their first activities tends to be teaching HN personnel how to call for close air support and artillery fires. The actual fire may come from HN or FID resources, or a combination. One of the reasons that fire direction is a priority is that experienced FID personnel will avoid firing at unknown targets, or firing at insurgents using civilian shields. Free-fire zones, such as used in Vietnam, can produce new insurgents faster than killing old ones.

Air interdiction and precision strikes
There is little place for air interdiction in fighting a local insurgency, in the most common sense of interrupting lines of supply. Only when the insurgents are being supplied from across a border, or at least from a remote area of sanctuary in the country, does this make sense. In the case, for example, of the Ho Chi Minh trail, any useful level of interdiction required either high-risk direct observation by special reconnaissance troops, or, in some cases, airborne sensors, such as the Vietnam-Era "Black Crow", which detected the "static" produced by the ignition system of trucks on the Ho Chi Minh trail, from distances up to 10 miles.

The coordination of human reconnaissance or unmanned remote sensors, with strike aircraft, missiles, or artillery, and avoiding collateral damage, requires advanced military skills. Such skills may not be within the repertoire of a weak nation, and the difficult political decision becomes whether the FID nation should undertake such strikes. Stronger states, especially when the insurgency is largely external, may be able to carry out such operations, but they, too, face a political problem: the potential "blowback" if the attack the territory of another nation.

With the advent of precision guided munitions that can be directed onto a specific target, it may be reasonable to use air attack against isolated command posts or other high-value facilities away from civilian areas. The combination of highly accurate, small weapons such as the Small Diameter Bomb, or even bombs without explosive filler, may be a wise way to attack specific, well-identified and difficult to reach targets. The skills necessary for identifying the target and guiding weapons to it, however, may not be something HN personnel have the experience to do.

Special reconnaissance
While special reconnaissance always runs the danger of coming into combat situations, there may be situations, in an FID situation, where intelligence on some key adversary installation is essential, but the necessary ground observations can be made only by specialists. Perhaps the HN can carry out a conventional amphibious landing, but do not have people trained or equipped for beach mapping, evaluating defenses, etc., by night. In such cases, when less risky alternatives such as air or space reconnaissance have been exhausted, the FID nation might lead a team in such a mission. When the HN has qualified people, perhaps who have trained in the FID home country, but not the equipment, they can join in such an operation.

It may be highly desirable, while a sensitive operation is in progress, to have the HN conduct distracting operations. The knowledge of the sensitive operation must be tightly held, and most of the troops carrying out the distraction—which ideally has a result more than mere distraction—will not know why they are taking a particular action.

Another example is where HN personnel guide a successful rescue effort in denied area, as Nguyen Van Kiet did with a United States Navy SEAL companion, Thomas R. Norris behind enemy lines. Norris received the US Medal of Honor for his part of the mission.

Direct action and unconventional warfare
When the FID force takes direct action, or leads UW forces, it needs a clear reason to do so. Jones cites some examples as:

 Operations against Rogue, Hostile Regimes or State Sponsors of Terrorism—a proven operational concept having been used twice since 11 September in Afghanistan and Iraq. These operations will either be the decisive or shaping operation depending on the political sensitivity of the target country.
 Operations against what will be referred to in this study as al Qa'ida states (AQ States) in which al Qa'ida is able to overthrow one or more of the regimes within the boundary of the 7th century caliphate. Unconventional warfare would be used to overthrow these regimes.
 Operations in failed states when there is no effective government, but an element within the population, such as a tribe or ethnic group, is the State for all intents and purposes. In this case unconventional warfare will be used to overthrow this State.

Conventional ground operations
This category does not include defense against external invasion by nation-state forces. It can, however, include operations against rebel conventional forces, guerillas in large strength, and insurgent bases.

Naval surveillance and patrol
A FID force can patrol international and coastal waters, perhaps using sensors not available to the HN. The surveillance vessels, aircraft, UAVs, etc. can guide the HN action without violating their own rules of engagement and participating in unauthorized direct combat.

History
Rather than the formal definition, it is more understandable with some historical context. The British generally seemed to be most consistent between theory and practice, although the minimum-effort theory, which worked in Malaya, did not seem to apply to Northern Ireland. French doctrine at the turn of the 20th century, involving working with locals, did not seem to be the heart of doctrine in Algeria and Indochina. France does seem to manage cooperation with former colonies, now clients.

US doctrine for Special Forces stayed consistent at the tactical level, but frequently failed at higher levels by dealing with unpopular governments; the Philippines were the greatest success.

United Kingdom
The UK tends to see the FID mission more as a capability of regular forces than special operations forces, at the lowest level of intensity possible. In 1934, Sir Charles W. Gwynn described the goal as  "the restoration of order through the use of minimum force." Sir Robert Thompson, who successfully defeated the Malayan insurgency,  "stressed tough administration, population control, and adherence to law. Decried use of high intensity military force or dirty tricks."

Sir Frank Kitson, former commander of UK land forces, said practical counterinsurgency had nothing "special" about it, but was mainstream British Army. Of course, there was significant use of the Special Air Service and other specialist units such as 14 Intelligence Company in Northern Ireland.  According to McClintock, the base of UK doctrine was:

 Population control through strong civil and military administrative structures.
 Strong foundation in law enforcement as tool and source of legitimacy.
 Emphasis upon the primacy of intelligence.
 Only limited role for elite commando-style strike force.

During the Malayan emergency, for example, the British Royal Air Force made extensive use of helicopters and fixed-wing transports to insert light infantry and Special Air Service units deep into the jungle, keeping them supplied by air for extended periods. These "deep-penetration" patrols were a key factor in defeating the Malayan insurgent forces in the more remote areas of the country

United States

Post WWII to Vietnam 
US Army Special Forces' original mission was to train and lead guerrillas in a nation occupied by another: "[US Special Forces provided] advisory personnel and mobile training teams to advise, train and provide operational assistance for paramilitary forces." The most likely case, at the time Special Forces were created, would be to lead resistance groups in European countries overrun by the expected Soviet Bloc attack. Over time, the term guerrilla warfare, especially led by Americans, fell into disfavor, and unconventional warfare took its place.

A November 1947 United States Department of the Army memorandum entitled A Study of Special and Subversive Operations was an early assessment of the lessons learned from World War II in the context of Cold War imperatives. In the only point in the memorandum concerning counter-guerrilla operations, the authors point to the German example:

In the early 1950s, the Department of the Army's Military History Division published a number of studies, the "German Report Series", which were devised to glean lessons from the German World War II experience. Some studies in the series were written by former German generals and general staff officers. 
The publications among other issues also analyzed the German response to the threat of guerrilla warfare. Indeed, the Wehrmacht had attempted a systematic approach to the threat of partisan warfare during Operation Barbarossa (the Russian campaign) in 1941, and later in the Balkans.

Developed by Wehrmacht tactics against Soviet partisans would play a part in the development of a postwar doctrine for fighting communist guerrillas was perhaps a natural product of the Cold War hysteria of the 1950s. The army's 1956 book-length study Soviet Partisans was the last and most comprehensive of the "German Report Series" on anti-partisan warfare. Michael McClintock writes that, "The disturbing similarity between the Nazi's view of the world and the American stance in the Cold War apparently went by the board."

Related activities, just after WWII, included a Military Assistance Advisory Group (MAAG), first in Greece. Another MAAG went to French Indochina in 1950. The U.S. really had no formal organization for providing foreign internal defense (FID) assistance, before the creation of the United States special operations forces. MAAG activities were intended to be largely advisory (i.e., noncombat), while the Special Forces was designed from the beginning for training and leading guerrillas of the host nation against an occupier.

Vietnam 
As U.S. involvement increased in Southeast Asia, Special Forces personnel were assigned to FID missions with South Vietnamese troops. The MAAG converted to Military Assistance Command Vietnam (MACV), the theater-level military command, in 1962, as a MAAG was not organized to command combat units. The first initiatives involved a CIA-sponsored program, operated by the Army Special Forces, to work with Vietnamese Civilian Irregular Defense Groups (CIDG) and Nung mercenaries to establish village defense. Subsequently, many members of these paramilitary units joined the Vietnamese Rangers, South Vietnam's National Police Special Units or special paramilitary forces, such as Counter-Terror Teams and Provincial Reconnaissance Units (PRU). They all later became a critical component of the military and civilian pacification and rural security programs in South Vietnam in the 1960s.

Starting from 1965, while they were not as properly trained for working with host nation personnel, the US Marine Corps Combined Action Program (CAP) also took on a role of reinforcing and training local village militias in the South Vietnam.

By 1967, the counterinsurgency military and civilian efforts in the South Vietnam were consolidated under the Civil Operations and Revolutionary Development Support (CORDS) command, which was shared between Saigon government, U.S. MACV and the CIA. Among CORDS multiple activities, the controversial Phoenix Program aimed at neutralizing the cadres of the Viet Cong Infrastructure (VCI) in South Vietnam, who created and executed a shadow system of government in the rural areas, stands out. In 1965–1972, the Phoenix Program  "had eliminated upwards of 80,000 VCI through defection, detention, or death".

The Viet Cong  insurgency in South Vietnam brought to life the "single largest and most comprehensive military counterinsurgency assessment apparatus in the history of warfare". It was run by the Office of the Secretary of Defense, MACV,  and the Central Intelligence Agency. "Hundreds of thousands of military personnel, civilians, Vietnamese nationals, intelligence experts, and analysts" collected and assessed the insurgency related information from 44 provinces, 257 districts, 2,464 villages, and 11,729 hamlets in South Vietnam to aid in decision making and charting the counterinsurgency strategy and tactics. The data was organized through catalogs and computer databases, such as, the Hamlet Evaluation System, the Terrorist Incident Reporting System, the Territorial Forces Effectiveness System, the Pacification Attitude Analysis System, the Situation Reports Army File, among others. Input metric varied from bars of soap distributed among the villagers to the "body counts" as a measure of the primary progress.

Vietnam to 9/11 
After the United States’ poor experience with combating insurgents in Vietnam, the country was hesitant to enter other conflicts that may result in insurgent style resistance. Scholars and military leaders such as Steven Metz and General Petraeus admitted that the United States had lost much of its counterinsurgency capabilities after the Vietnam war.  In the 1980s the U.S. partly rebuilt their counterinsurgency abilities when the Soviet Union again began to sponsor insurgencies in third world countries such as El Salvador. With the end of the cold war in the 1990s, the U.S. again purged its counterinsurgency knowledge and capabilities, “assuming it was a legacy of the Cold War that would fade to irrelevance with the demise of the Soviet Union."

In the post-Cold War era, Operation Desert Storm was the only conflict in which the U.S. military played a major active role. In this conflict U.S. commanders demonstrated their mastery of conventional warfare using superior technology, firepower, and tactical skill. The swift and devastating use of technology in this conflict led many to believe that information warfare was the future face of combat.

Post 9/11

Counterinsurgency in Iraq and Afghanistan 
The United States' avoidance of conflicts that could turn into insurgencies began to be noticed by terrorist leaders. In a 1997 interview with CNN, Osama bin Laden, then leader of Al Qaeda, said in reference to the US withdrawal in Somalia, "After a little resistance, the American troops left after achieving nothing... They left after some resistance from powerless, poor, unarmed people whose only weapon is the belief in Allah the Almighty,". On September 11, 2001 bin Laden orchestrated the deadliest terrorist attack ever carried out on United States soil. This attack shocked the United States out of its insurgency avoidance policy.

Shortly after the September 11th attacks, the United States deployed forces to Afghanistan to overthrow the Taliban government which was harboring bin Laden. United States forces once again deployed superior technology, firepower, and tactics to defeat Taliban forces in a relatively short period. However, Afghanistan's history of a weak centralized government coupled with neighboring countries providing safe haven for Taliban leaders made the construction of a stable new government difficult. In 2006, there was a resurgence in Taliban insurgency in Afghanistan.

The invasion of Iraq during Operation Iraqi Freedom saw many parallels to the invasion of Afghanistan during Operation Enduring Freedom. United States ground troops entered Iraq in March 2001. The initial invasion of Iraq was characterized by “shock and awe”. Shock and awe was a tactic designed to demonstrate the overwhelming power of the United States to the Iraqi people through a display of unmatched artillery and air power. This tactic resulted in US forces occupying the capital of Iraq, Baghdad, within two weeks of the invasion.

However, U.S forces encountered pockets of Sunni resistance in Baghdad and surrounding cities. This resistance marked the beginnings of the insurgency that has plagued US forces during its occupation of Iraq.  Several factors including a failure to restore public utilities, the disbanding of the Iraqi military, and violence between US troops and Iraqi civilians led to increased resistance and the formation of insurgent groups. The United States' postwar plan did not adequately prepare the U.S. for an insurgency scenario.

The doctrine of shock and awe proved ineffective against eliminating small pockets of insurgent fighters. U.S. forces began to shift away from the shock and awe strategy to “hearts and minds”. Hearts and minds shifted away from displays of massive firepower and attempted to persuade to local population to support the new government through more peaceful means The United States has sent millions of dollars of humanitarian aid to the people of Iraq and Afghanistan and U.S. forces have worked closely with other humanitarian groups such as the red cross to ensure that humanitarian aid is distributed throughout these areas.

In addition to winning the "hearts and minds" of the people, the United States vastly improved its intelligence gathering techniques in an effort to dismantle insurgency networks. In 2005, the NSA worked closely with the CIA to deploy airborne cameras and intercept cell phone signals around Iraq. This gave United States forces the ability to watch the country with what General McChrystal termed an "unblinking eye". This level of surveillance created a flow of intelligence that gave Special Forces teams the ability to conduct almost nightly raids against key targets in order to dismantle insurgency networks more effectively.

Another tactic used by the United States in both Iraq and Afghanistan is and effort to shift the responsibility of providing security for specific areas to the local populations by setting up local police forces. The Afghan Local Police (ALP) program has assisted the US in raiding insurgent compounds and providing security for areas that US forces have cleared out of active insurgent groups. The ALP have encountered difficulties recruiting individuals willing to defy the Taliban for fear of retaliation, a lack of funding from the local government, and some members of the ALP feeling they are little more than a “wall of meat” for US forces.

US forces also focused on stemming the flow of heroin out of Afghanistan. It is estimated that 90% of the world's heroin supply was being exported out of Afghanistan. The sale of heroin was used at least in part to fund insurgent activities in the country and cutting of the flow of cash became a top priority for the United States.

In 2018, journalist and former US Army ranger Marty Skovlund Jr. documented a team from the United States Army Special Forces performing a FID mission to combat ISIS in Afghanistan.

Counterinsurgency in Colombia 
In an effort to reducing the export of Heroin from Afghanistan, the United States committed a large number of resources to the Colombian government to combat the Fuerzas Armadas Revolucionarias Colombianas (FARC) insurgency in Colombia. The FARC was identified as a key component in the Heroin supply chain. Instead of deploying forces to Colombia to conduct counterinsurgency operations, the United States maintained a minimal presence. Instead, the United States focused on providing resources and training to the Colombian military and police force to conduct their own Counterinsurgency operations. By 2011, the FARC had been marginalized and Columbia had established a strong central government.

Preemptive Counterinsurgency in Africa 
The United States has maintained a presence in Africa in order to decrease the risk of an insurgency. In 2013, the U.S. had 5000 troops in Africa that “carried out 55 operations, 10 exercises and 481 security cooperation activities.”  The U.S. strategy in Africa is a three pronged approach that includes military support and training, highly advertised humanitarian projects, and intelligence gathering. When gathering intelligence, the United States has focused its efforts on cultural intelligence to support “Africom strategic movements on the continent.” The end goal of the U.S. is to gather “...socio-cultural and political knowledge of the potential enemy before s/he becomes an enemy.”

Human rights violations
Unfortunately, human rights violations tend to be common during insurgencies and counterinsurgency efforts. Western powers conducting multiple foreign internal defense (FID) operations are coming under increasing pressure to provide human rights and Geneva Conventions training to host nation personnel, although the results vary. Part of the challenge arrives when host nation personnel gets involved in combat without FID advisers, who are supposed to monitor their conduct and prevent abuses. The 1980-1992 Salvadoran Civil War, where human rights violations were documented on both sides, can be cited as an example.

The U.S. aid allowed the Salvadoran military to defeat the Farabundo Martí National Liberation Front (FMLN). In one particular case which occurred in December 1981, the US-trained Salvadoran army's elite counter-insurgency unit, the Atlácatl Battalion, commanded by Lt. Col. Domingo Monterrosa, willingly committed retaliation killings at El Mozote, Morazan province, just two days after returning home from the US where they had trained in counter insurgency warfare. The result was more than 800 civilians, including 131 children under the age of 12, murdered during search-and-destroy offensive. The plans to unleash terror against civilians became known to at least one U.S. Special Forces military adviser, which was revealed by Greg Walker, a former U.S. Army Special Forces Staff Sergeant, who served in El Salvador from 1982 to 1985. Apparently, no formal U.S. government investigation of that particular adviser's failure to deter the massacre has ever been carried out. Moreover,

Returning to the El Mozote massacre, it was duly reported to the American public by Ray Bonner from The New York Times and Anna Guillermoprieto from The Washington Post, however, the U.S. State Department denied the participation of the Salvadoran army in mass murder.

References

External links

 Master Sergeant Michael O'Brien. "Foreign Internal Defense in Iraq", January–March 2012 edition of Special Warfare

Counterinsurgency
Special forces
United States Department of Defense doctrine